Vaginal melanoma is a rare malignancy that originates from melanocytes in the vaginal epithelium. It is also known as a melanocytic tumor or as a malignant melanoma. It is aggressive and infrequently cured. The median overall survival is 16 months. Vaginal melanoma accounts 5.5% of all vaginal cancers and only 1% of all melanomas diagnosed in women. Vaginal melanomas are frequently diagnosed in advanced stages of the disease. The prognosis is poor and the most important risk factor is the presence of lymph node metastases.

Presentation
This cancer most often develops on the lowest third of the vagina. It is darkly pigmented and of an irregular T-shape, but amelanotic melanomas have been described in 7% of cases. Melanoma of the vagina can be several centimeters in size.

Histology
When the tissue is assessed, the histological characteristics include: 
 the shape of the cells appear similar to epithelial and spindle-shaped
 the growth occurs in the shapes of sheets and nests
 the presence of melanin in the cells
 the nucleus of the cells is large and abnormal

Other cancers 
Other cancerous conditions arise from vaginal epithelium:
 Vaginal squamous-cell carcinoma arises from the squamous cells of the vaginal epithelium 
 Vaginal adenocarcinoma arises from secretory cells in the vaginal epithelium
 Clear cell adenocarcinoma of the vagina this malignancy arises in some women prenatally exposed to diethylstilbestrol

Diagnosis
A biopsy should be obtained from all suspicious lesions and Immunocytochemistry can reveal positive results for S-110 protein, HMB 45 and melan A. Once the diagnosis of vaginal melanoma is established, additional examinations should be performed to exclude the spread to regional lymph nodes or distant organs, as the diagnosis of vaginal melanoma is often delayed. Lymph-node involvement is the most important prognostic factor.

Treatment
Surgery represents the primary treatment modality. Chemotherapy may be ineffective, but checkpoint inhibitors and BRAF and MEK inhibitors have been recently tested in vaginal melanomas. Less than 10% of vaginal melanomas have BRAF-mutations. Therefore BRAF-inhibitors play only a minor role in vaginal melanomas (unlike in skin melanomas). However, a recent study has shown that checkpoint inhibitors (inkluding CTLA-4 inhibitors and PD-1 inhibitors) are effective in the treatment of advanced vulvovaginal melanomas.

References

External links 

Melanoma
Vaginal diseases
Disturbances of human pigmentation
Epithelium